Palocabildo is a town and municipality in the Tolima department of Colombia.  

Municipalities of Tolima Department